At Play Vol. 2 is a compilation album by Canadian electronic music producer Deadmau5, following from the success of the first At Play album. The album features ten "DJ friendly" tracks. However, unlike its predecessor At Play, the album is mixed, yet the track markers are divided in a manner that allows DJs to also utilize them for mixing.

Track listing

References

External links 
 At Play, Vol. 2 at Discogs

2009 albums
Deadmau5 albums
Sequel albums